Eddie Yokley (born April 4, 1952) is a Democratic American politician from Greeneville, Tennessee.  He has served four terms in the Tennessee General Assembly representing Tennessee's 11th district in the Tennessee House of Representatives. Yokley ran and lost to David Hawk for Tennessee's 5th District in 2012.

Education
He graduated South Greene High School.
He received his B.S. from East Tennessee State University.
Jordan graduated from the United States Military Academy at West Point in 2005.

Family
He is married to Carolyn, and they have two sons, Jordan and Tyler.

Biographical information
 Member of Towering Oaks Baptist Church
 Designated as a Tennessee Certified Assessor by State Board of Equalization
 Designation as a Certified Public Administrator by the University of Tennessee Institute for Public Service
 Real Estate Broker and Auctioneer, 15 years appraisal experience
 Nashville Auction School (Graduate, Honorary Colonel Degree)
 Tennessee Realtors Institute (designated Graduate Realtors Institute)
 Realtors National Marketing Institute (designated a Certified Residential Specialist)
 United States Army Paratrooper
 U.S. Army Military Intelligence Photo Interpretation School

Public office
 House member of the 103rd, 104th, 105th, and 106th General Assemblies
 Former Vice Chairman and Secretary, House State and Local Committee
 Former Chair, House Elections Committee
 Former Member, Fiscal Review Committee
 Former Member, House State Government Subcommittee
 Former Member, House Utilities and Banking Subcommittee
 Former Member, House Commerce Committee
 Former Member, Local Government Subcommittee
 Former Member, State Government Committee
 Former Member of the Industrial Impact Committee
 Appointed for Police Officer’s and Standards Board by Former Speaker of the House, Jimmy Naifeh
 Appointed for Southern Regional Education Board by Former Governor Phil Bredesen
 Served as Greene County Assessor of Property from 1992 to 2004

Community involvement
 4-H Club Volunteer Leader
 Former President, West Points Military Academy Parents Club of East Tennessee
 Former Charter President, Lost State of Franklin Jaycees
 Former Boy Scouts of America Troop 94 Committee and Troop 96 Commissioner
 Board Member, Boys and Girls Club of Greeneville
 Past President Greeneville Board of Realtors
 Past Director, Tennessee Association of Realtors
 Past President, Nathanael Greene Museum

Honors and awards
 2011 Boys and Girls Club National Service to Youth Award
 2006 Silver Bayonet Award from Tennessee AmVets
 2004 Greeneville Greene County Boys and Girls Club Extra Mile Award
 2003 Legislator of the Year Boys and Girls Club of Tennessee
 2002 Recognition by the Modern Woodmen of America for Public Service;
 Designated a Certified Public Administrator in 1999 by the UT Institute for Public Service
 Designated a Tennessee Certified Assessor by the State Board of Equalization
 Greeneville Realtor of the Year (1984 and 1986)
 Selected one of the Top 10 Jaycee Presidents in Tennessee (4th Quarter 1989)
 Past Discom Soldier of the Month, 101st Airborne Division, Fort Campbell, Kentucky

References

East Tennessee State University alumni
1952 births
Living people
People from Greeneville, Tennessee
Democratic Party members of the Tennessee House of Representatives